The Old Mt. Carmel Cemetery, Wrought-Iron Cross Site, near Balta, North Dakota, is a historic site of wrought-iron crosses that was listed on the National Register of Historic Places in 1989.  The listing included six contributing objects.

It includes work by John Krim, of Pierce County.  He was one of a number of "German-Russian blacksmiths in central North Dakota" who developed individual styles in their crosses and whose "work was known for miles around them."

See also
 Old St. Mary's Cemetery, Wrought-Iron Cross Site

References

External links
 
 

Cemeteries on the National Register of Historic Places in North Dakota
German-Russian culture in North Dakota
National Register of Historic Places in Pierce County, North Dakota